Live Unplugged may refer to:

 Live Unplugged (Smilers album), 2005
 Live Unplugged (Jeremy Camp album), 2005

See also
Live & Unplugged, a 2010 EP by Sick Puppies
Live and Unplugged, a 2016 album by Sleeping with Sirens